Zulu Nation may refer to:
 Zulu people
 Universal Zulu Nation, a hip-hop awareness group
 Zululand (disambiguation)